Lieutenant Robert McGregor Innes Ireland (12 June 1930 – 22 October 1993), was a British military officer, engineer, and motor racing driver, with 1 Championship and 8 non-Championship Formula 1 race victories, and several sports car wins including one Tourist Trophy. Ireland was a larger-than-life character who, according to a rival team boss, "lived without sense, without an analyst, and provoked astonishment and affection from everyone."

Early life
Ireland was born 12 June 1930 in Mytholmroyd, West Riding of Yorkshire, England, the son of a Scottish veterinary surgeon. His family returned to Kirkcudbright, Scotland during his youth, and he trained as an engineer with Rolls-Royce, first in Glasgow and later in London. Commissioned as a lieutenant in the King's Own Scottish Borderers, he served with the Parachute Regiment in the Suez Canal Zone during 1953 and 1954.

Racing career
Ireland began racing a Riley 9 in 1954. His first year of nationally competitive events was 1957, by which time he was running a small engineering firm in Surrey. Success in sports car racing saw him make his Formula One debut for Team Lotus in 1959. In 1960 he won three non-championship Formula One races and finished fourth in the World Drivers Championship. Badly injured in the 1961 Monaco Grand Prix, Ireland recovered to win the Solitude Grand Prix and Flugplatzrennen races, then finished the season with a victory in the United States Grand Prix at Watkins Glen. He was sacked at the end of the season as team boss Colin Chapman considered Jim Clark a better bet.

He was encouraged by Bill France, founder of NASCAR, to participate in the 1967 Daytona 500, one of the last races of his career, where the V8 engine of his year old Dodge exploded outside the stands.

He worked as a journalist for ESPN for several F1 races in the late 1980s as well as the American Road & Track magazine, Autocar magazine, and skippering fishing trawlers in the North Atlantic. Towards the end of his life, he was elected president of the British Racing Drivers' Club, which post he still held at the time of his death from cancer on 22 October 1993, at Reading, Berkshire, England.

Writing

A talented writer, Ireland produced a classic autobiography, All Arms and Elbows. Marathon in the Dust, published in 1970 is Ireland's account of the grueling 1968 Daily Express London-Sydney Marathon, which Ireland completed with 2 friends, fellow F1 competitor Michael Taylor and British bobsledder Andy Hedges in a Mercedes Benz 280 SE.

Personal life

On 30 October 1954 Ireland married Scarborough schoolteacher Norma Thomas. They had two daughters before divorcing in 1967. He then married Edna Humphries also in 1967. Ireland married his third wife Jean Mander (née Howarth), a former fashion model, on 11 June 1993 at Newbury register office. Jean had been engaged to Mike Hawthorn at the time of Hawthorn's death in 1959. Ireland also had a son who died in 1992.

Racing record

Complete Formula One World Championship results
(key) (Races in italics indicate fastest lap)

Non-championship Formula One results 
(key) (Races in bold indicate pole position)

 The Parnell Lotus driven by Ireland in 1965 and 1966 was a written-off 25 rebuilt around a 33 monocoque.

Complete British Saloon Car Championship results
(key) (Races in bold indicate pole position; races in italics indicate fastest lap.)

24 Hours of Le Mans results

NASCAR: Grand National

Daytona 500

References

External links

Information about Innes Ireland

King's Own Scottish Borderers officers
British Parachute Regiment officers
English mechanical engineers
English Formula One drivers
Racing drivers from Yorkshire
British racing drivers
Team Lotus Formula One drivers
British Racing Partnership Formula One drivers
Reg Parnell Racing Formula One drivers
Bernard White Racing Formula One drivers
Formula One race winners
24 Hours of Le Mans drivers
12 Hours of Reims drivers
World Sportscar Championship drivers
20th-century British businesspeople
British non-fiction writers
British male journalists
People from Mytholmroyd
1930 births
1993 deaths
Engineers from Yorkshire
20th-century non-fiction writers
Military personnel from Yorkshire
Ecurie Ecosse drivers